Luis Alberto Cruz Díaz (28 April 1925 – 1998) was a Uruguayan football midfielder who played for Uruguay in the 1954 FIFA World Cup. He also played for Club Nacional de Football.

References

External links
FIFA profile

1925 births
Uruguayan footballers
Uruguay international footballers
Association football midfielders
Uruguayan Primera División players
Club Nacional de Football players
1954 FIFA World Cup players
1998 deaths